Cheden Holt, situated on a hilltop about a mile from the rural village of Hambledon in Hampshire, was a home venue of the Hambledon Club. It was used for a single first-class cricket match in 1776, when a Hampshire side played a Kent team. This is the only important match played at the ground, with no further mention of any other matches after 1776.

References

1776 establishments in England
City of Winchester
Cricket grounds in Hampshire
Cricket in Hampshire
Defunct cricket grounds in England
Defunct sports venues in Hampshire
English cricket venues in the 18th century
Hampshire
History of Hampshire
Sport in Hampshire
Sports venues completed in 1776
Sports venues in Hampshire